Villa Carlos Paz is a city in the center-north of the province of Córdoba, Argentina, in the south of the Punilla Valley, lying on the western slope of the Sierras Chicas. The area of Punilla is a major tourist destination on the national level, and Villa Carlos Paz is in turn the most important city of Punilla, favoured by its closeness to the populous Córdoba City, the capital of the province. Popular tourist activities include bathing in one of the
many rivers, fishing, evening shows, kite surfing, windsurfing, hiking and mountain biking.

Geography
Villa Carlos Paz is located on the southern shore of the San Roque Lake. It is crossed by the San Antonio River and the Los Chorrillos Stream. The city was founded by the rancher Carlos Nicandro Paz in 1913.

The Hang suspension bridges road was built in 1918 to link the town to the Valley Traslasierra. This was replaced in the 1950s by the Camino de las Altas Cumbres.

International relations

Twin towns — Sister cities
Villa Carlos Paz is twinned with:
  Tarija, Bolivia
  Termas de Río Hondo, Argentina 
  San Bernardino, Paraguay 
  Peschiera del Garda, Italy

Notable events
In 2012, an Argentinian dog named Capitán was reported to have sat every evening for six years on his owner's grave. This was compounded by the fact that the family had never brought the dog to the graveyard and the dog had managed to find it himself. The municipal cemetery’s director, Héctor Baccega, said that the first time he saw the dog, he arrived at the cemetery alone. The dog then did a couple of laps around the place before finding his master’s grave — all on his own.  He arrives each day at 6:00 p.m.

The town has been used many times as the base of the Rally Argentina, with the streets of the town being a super special stage in 2010. It was also a stage of the 2015 and 2016 Dakar Rally.

References

External links
 
 Complete Tourist Guide website
 Official website
 News
 Tourism Carlos Paz from abroad

Populated places in Córdoba Province, Argentina
Populated places established in 1914
Tourism in Argentina
Cities in Argentina
Populated lakeshore places in Argentina
Argentina
Córdoba Province, Argentina